Victor Ehrenberg (22 November 1891 – 25 January 1976) was a German Jewish historian.

Life 
Ehrenberg was born in Altona, Hamburg to a noted German Jewish family. He was the younger brother of Hans Ehrenberg and the nephew of the jurist Victor Ehrenberg, and a nephew of economist Richard Ehrenberg.

Victor Ehrenberg served in the German Army on the Western Front during World War I and was awarded the Iron Cross, 2nd Class for his combat service.

Ehrenberg was married to Eva Dorothea Ehrenberg, née Sommer (1891–1964), a daughter of Siegfried Sommer and Helene Sommer (High Court Judge, Hessen). He was the father of Geoffrey and Lewis Elton, and grandfather of Ben Elton.

He died, aged 84, in London.

A bequest made in his will to the Institute of Classical Studies, University of London funds the Grote prize, an academic prize for outstanding scholarship in the field of Ancient History.

Works 
 Ost und West. Studien zur geschichtlichen Problematik der Antike. Brno 1935.
 Alexander and the Greeks. Blackwell, Oxford 1938.
  The people of Aristophanes. Blackwell, Oxford 1943.
 Deutsche Ausgabe: Aristophanes und das Volk von Athen. Eine Soziologie der altattischen Komödie. Artemis, Zürich und Stuttgart 1968.
 Der Staat der Griechen. 2., expanded edition . Artemis, Zürich und Stuttgart 1965.
 Polis und Imperium. Beiträge zur Alten Geschichte. Hrsg. v. K. F. Stroheker und A.J. Graham. Artemis, Zürich und Stuttgart 1965.
 From Solon to Socrates. Greek history and civilization during the sixth and fifth centuries B. C. Methuen, London 1968 und Nachdrucke,

References

External links
 

1891 births
1976 deaths
German classical scholars
German male non-fiction writers
20th-century German historians
People from Altona, Hamburg
Jewish emigrants from Nazi Germany to the United Kingdom

Ehrenberg family